Bradford Christian School is a private school situated in Bradford, West Yorkshire, England. It has a pre-school, primary, middle and upper school, and takes pupils from the age of 3 to 16 years old. It has been in operation since 1993.

School performance

The school was inspected by Ofsted in 2016 and judged Inadequate. It was inspected again in 2018 and judged Good.

In 2022, the percentage of children at the school achieving GCSEs in English and maths at grade 5 or above was 27%, compared to 41% in Bradford as a whole and 50% nationally.

Challenge of Corporal punishment ban in schools
In 2002 the school was one of a group of Christian schools which challenged the ban on corporal punishment in  UK schools, citing Proverbs Chapter 23:13–14: "Do not withhold discipline from a child; if you punish him with the rod, he will not die", but their case, R. (on the application of Williamson) v Secretary of State for Education and Employment, was rejected by the Law Lords in 2005.

Charity Commission inquiry

In 2014 the Charity Commission published an Inquiry into the school, as one of a number of "charities that were in default of their statutory obligations to meet reporting requirements by failing to file their annual documents for two or more years in the last five years", had been given a final warning and were still in default. The report stated that the school's trustees response had been "whilst they had failed to submit accounts on time the charity was still functioning as a successful organisation, the trustees were keen to put things right and would not allow the situation to happen again".

References

External links
Official website
Ofsted reports

Private schools in the City of Bradford
Educational institutions established in 1993
Schools in Bradford
1993 establishments in England
Christian schools in England